Echium sabulicola (syn. Echium confusum Coincy,  Echium maritimum Willd.) is a plant in the genus Echium. It is native to the sandy areas of the coasts of the western Mediterranean region from Spain east to southern France and Italy, including the Balearic Islands, Corsica, Sardinia and Sicily. The plant requires dry air and exposure to the sun.

The flowers have five sepals. The plant blooms in the end of April and can bloom again in the autumn months with favourable weather.

References

External links
Echium sabulicola photo
European Environment Agency: Echium sabulicola
 Flora d'Algaida: Echium sabulicola

sabulicola
Flora of Malta